Brumath is a commune in the Bas-Rhin department in Grand Est in north-eastern France.

History
Brumath occupies the site of the Roman Brocomagus.
Maria Christina of Saxony, aunt of Louis XVI,  died in the château in the city. The building was partly demolished in the Revolution.

Geography

Population

Landmarks
Brumath has a Roman Catholic and a Protestant church. The Protestant church is housed in the former castle of the Hanau-Lichtenberg family since 1804. The vaulted basement of the castle also houses the Musée archéologique, displaying findings made in and around the ancient Roman town of Brocomagus.

Transportation
Brumath is served by the Route nationale 63, linking Strasbourg to Haguenau, and by the A4 autoroute.
It has a railway station on the line linking Strasbourg and Metz.

Notable people
 George Brumder's ancestry is from Brumath as is the origin of his surname.
 Maria Christina of Saxony died in Brumath.
 The great-great-grandmother of J. K. Rowling,  Salomé Schuch, lived in Brumath.

See also
 Battle of Brumath
 Bernard Schreiner (1937-2020), French politician born in Brumath
 Communes of the Bas-Rhin department

References

External links 

Official website

Communes of Bas-Rhin
Triboci
Bas-Rhin communes articles needing translation from French Wikipedia